Victor Șelin; (born 19 August 1965) is a Moldovan businessman and politician, a former journalist, currently president of the Social Democratic Party of Moldova.

He is the owner of the Moldovan cinema network "Patria", which is а monopolist in Moldova. Also among other business he has, he owns the amusement park "Aventura Park", one of the largest and most famous amusement parks in Chisinau. According to the magazine "VIP Magazin", Victor  Șelin founded the first private security agency in the Republic of Moldova; and thanks to it, Moldova was the first CIS country to have a law on detective activity.

Victor Şelin is a graduate of the Faculty of Journalism of the State University of Moldova. He worked as editor at "Teleradio-Moldova" until 1989, when he left journalism, entering the business.

He remained present in the field of journalism through the Russian newspaper "Vremea", which he is patronizing. 

Between 2003 and 2009, he was not a member of any party. 

In the elections of 5 April 2009, Victor Şelin ranks third in the list of the Social Democratic Party of Moldova, but was not on the list of repeated elections, to which the SDP was already headed by former Prime Ministers Dumitru Braghiș and Vasile Tarlev. 

Previously, she was part of the formation "Plai Natal" and the Our Moldova Alliance, which she left in 2004 after a public quarrel with Serafim Urechean. 

Victor Șelin is married and has two children.

References

1965 births
Living people
Moldovan businesspeople
Social Democratic Party (Moldova) politicians
People from Rîșcani District
21st-century Moldovan politicians